Barton v. Barr, 590 U.S. __ (2020) is a Supreme Court of the United States ruling which upheld a decision by the Eleventh Circuit Court of Appeals that permanent residents could be rendered "inadmissible" to the United States for an offence after the initial seven years of residence under the Reed Amendment.

Background 
Andre Martello Barton was born in Jamaica admitted to the United States in May, 1989. In 1992, he became a lawful green-card resident of the U.S. However, he was found guilty of criminal damage to property, aggravated assault,  possession of a firearm during the commission of a felony (O.C.G.A. § 16-11-106) and violations of Georgia's Controlled Substances Act.

The Department of Homeland Security (DHS) determined that Barton could be deported for these offences. Barton filed an appeal to cancel his deportation to the United States Attorney General under 8 U.S.C. § 1229b(a) as he had been a permanent resident for over seven years.

Ruling 
Justice Brett Kavanaugh, writing the majority opinion, ruled that DHS could deport Barton stating "the immigration laws enacted by Congress do not allow cancellation of removal when a lawful permanent resident has amassed a criminal record of this kind."

In a dissenting opinion, Justice Sonia Sotomayor argued that as Barton had already been admitted, the Government must prove he is deportable rather than just inadmissable.

References 

2020 in United States case law
United States Supreme Court cases of the Roberts Court
United States Supreme Court cases
United States immigration and naturalization case law
Legal history of Georgia (U.S. state)
Deportation from the United States
Jamaican-American history